Örencik is a village in the District of Kızılcahamam, Ankara Province, Turkey. To differentiate it from the other nearby Örencik village in the District of Kazan, people in the area call Örencik "Çakmak Örencik", while calling the other village "Leblebi Örencik."

References

Villages in Kızılcahamam District